Acacia hypermeces is a shrub belonging to the genus Acacia and the subgenus Lycopodiifoliae. It is native to an area in the Northern Territory and the Kimberley region of Western Australia.

Ecology
The sprawling shrub typically produces yellow flowers in June.

See also
List of Acacia species

References

hypermeces
Acacias of Western Australia
Taxa named by Alex George